Shule (Russian and Tajik: Шуле) is a village in central Tajikistan. It is part of the jamoat Rahimzoda in Rasht District, one of the Districts of Republican Subordination. Shule is 9 km northeast of the town Navobod.

References

Populated places in Districts of Republican Subordination